

This is a list of the National Register of Historic Places listings in Miami-Dade County, Florida.

This is intended to be a complete list of the properties and districts on the National Register of Historic Places in Miami-Dade County, Florida, United States. The locations of National Register properties and districts for which the latitude and longitude coordinates are included below, may be seen in a map.

There are 190 properties and districts listed on the National Register in Miami-Dade County, including 6 National Historic Landmarks. The parts outside the city of Miami include 115 of these properties and districts, including 1 National Historic Landmark; they are listed here, while the properties in Miami are listed separately. One property, the Venetian Causeway, is split between Miami and Miami Beach, and is thus included on both lists.  Another property was once listed but has been removed.

Current listings

|}

Former listing

|}

See also
 List of National Historic Landmarks in Florida
 National Register of Historic Places listings in Florida

References

 
Miami-Dade County
Miami-related lists